Thomas Tracy Piotrowski (born October 17, 1960) is a retired American professional basketball player.

A 7'1" center from La Salle University, Piotrowski was selected by the Portland Trail Blazers with the 62nd pick of the 1983 NBA Draft. He played 18 games for Portland during the 1983–84 NBA season, averaging 1.7 points and 0.9 rebounds per contest.  Piotrowski split the 1984–85 season between two teams in the Continental Basketball Association, the Louisville Catbirds and the Bay State Bombardiers.  He averaged 6.5 points and 4.7 rebounds over 35 games.

He served as boys' basketball coach at Atlantic Christian School in Egg Harbor Township, New Jersey. He currently serves as boys' basketball coach at Atlantic County Institute of Technology in Mays Landing, New Jersey and Video Production Instructor.  He is a 1978 graduate of Great Valley High School in Malvern, Pennsylvania.

Notes

1960 births
Living people
American men's basketball players
Basketball players from Pennsylvania
Bay State Bombardiers players
Centers (basketball)
La Salle Explorers men's basketball players
Louisville Catbirds players
People from West Chester, Pennsylvania
Portland Trail Blazers draft picks
Portland Trail Blazers players